is a Japanese retired women's professional shogi player ranked 4-dan. She is a former representative director of the Ladies Professional Shogi-players' Association of Japan. She is also a former  and  title holder.

Promotion history
Ishibashi's promotion history was as follows.
1993: Women's Professional Apprentice League
1993, October 1: 2-kyū
1995, April 1: 1-kyū
1996, April 1: 1-dan
1996, September 2: 2-dan
1999, June 29: 3-dan
2004, July 23: 4-dan

Note: All ranks are women's professional ranks.

Titles and other championships
Ishibashi appeared in women's professional shogi major title matches nine times and won three titles. She won the 21st  title in 1999, and the 18th and 19th  titles in 2007 and 2008.  In addition to major titles, Ishibashi won five JSA run shogi non-title tournaments, and two LPSA run non-title tournaments.

Major titles

Other championships

Note: Tournaments marked with an asterisk (*) are no longer held or currently suspended.

Awards and honors
Ishibashi received the Japan Shogi Association's Annual Shogi Awards for "Women's Professional of the Year" for the April 1999March 2000 shogi year, and the "Women's Professional Award" for the April 2002March 2003 shogi year.

References

External links
 

Japanese shogi players
Living people
Professional shogi players from Tokyo Metropolis
Retired women's professional shogi players
LPSA
1980 births
People from Western Tokyo
Women's Ōshō
Women's Ōi